Stillman Pond (October 26, 1803 – September 30, 1878) – a farmer, harnessmaker, and land speculator by trade, and a native of Hubbardston, Worcester, Massachusetts – was a Mormon pioneer and church leader recognized for the great personal sacrifices he made in the Mormon exodus from Nauvoo, Illinois, to the Great Basin's Salt Lake Valley (September 1846 – September 1847), in what would later become Utah Territory.

Massachusetts: the beginnings of joy and affliction 
Stillman Pond was the descendant of hardy colonial New England progenitors of the Puritan persuasion, many of whom served as ministers and selectmen of various townships. The Massachusetts native was born only two years before the birth of the prophet Joseph Smith, Jr., with whom he shared a common ancestry (in separatist minister John Lathrop, 1584–1653) and whose fledgling American religion he would one day embrace.

While Stillman's paternal grandfather, Joseph Pond (b. 1756) was a Revolutionary War soldier, his great-great-grandfather Ezra Pond (b. 1692) was a restless, dissatisfied pastor of a local Franklin, Massachusetts congregation. In the Puritan spirit of Roger Williams and Anne Hutchinson, Ezra refused to comply with the orders of the community elders, and he was forced to leave town, moving with his family to Hubbardston. Stillman's maternal great-great-grandfather was Lt. Paul Moore (b. 1711), an American army commander at the Battle of Bunker Hill.

Perhaps because of the firebrand nature of his religious heritage, a passionate, restless strain of spiritual fervor seemed to course, as it were, through Stillman's veins. It was this spirit that later would move him, in the autumn of 1843, to commit his growing family to making an arduous trek across five states to a burgeoning new city on the Mississippi – Nauvoo, Illinois – where they might join with the relentlessly driven body of Latter-day Saints there assembling.

Stillman himself – a farmer, harnessmaker, and land speculator by trade – was ever thrifty and industrious from the days of his youth, always ensuring that he sold at a profit. Marrying in 1825 one Almyra Whittemore, he removed to Westminster, Worcester, Massachusetts, where he purchased several tracts of land. There he remained until 1832, when he moved to Templeton. Almyra bore him 5 children (four girls and one boy), but at age 33 she died in the yellow fever epidemic that swept through New England in 1833 and was buried at Hubbardston.

Mormon convert and polygamist 
A young widower now with five children, Stillman Pond would ultimately marry five times and produce a multitudinous posterity.

Marrying again for the first time in 1834, to one Maria Louisa Davis, Stillman settled again at Hubbardston, but moved his family in 1837 to New Salem, Massachusetts, purchasing there three tracts of land over the next five years. There, he and his family fostered new friendships, including with the Haskell family (later reuniting with them at Nauvoo). Most significantly, it was at New Salem in 1841 that Stillman and his family welcomed into their home traveling Mormon missionaries and were converted, through their efforts, to the new faith that Smith had founded a decade earlier. The family was baptized on December 28, 1841 under the hand of Elder Elias Harris.

The Mormon message, which afforded hope for his loved ones, both living and dead, filled Stillman's troubled soul with great comfort and peace. Able to sell his land in order to join the Missouri-driven Latter-day Saints at Nauvoo, Illinois, Stillman and his family, having embraced 'the New Covenant,' made their trek in the fall of 1843.

Nauvoo merchant, Elder and Seventy 
In the would-be refuge of the 'City Beautiful' Stillman built a two-story red brick home (in the front part of which he established a store) a few blocks southwest of the Nauvoo Temple on Munson Street (block 106) – equidistant at points east and north from the banks of the mighty Mississippi, which forms the city's southern and western borders.

Their new neighbor, as Stillman soon discovered, was a latter-day Apostle of the Lord, for not only did the edifice lay but 'a few rods' west of the homes of friends and fellow converts Winslow Farr and his son Lorin, but also just east of the historic red-brick residence of Mormon Apostle Heber C. Kimball – confidante and councilor to the Mormon Prophet of the Restoration, Joseph Smith, Jr. Another apostle, moreover, resided on the same block – Wilford Woodruff – whose red-brick home stood just north of the Farr homes on Durphy Street.

The Pond family home & store (1843–1846) was thus situated west of the intersection at Durphy and Munson Streets (its site excavated in 1970 by Nauvoo Restoration Inc.) – on the same 4-acre 'lower city' lot where, in their restored incarnations, the historic Kimball, Woodruff, and Farr homes can be seen today (the Winslow Farr home is at the intersection's northwest corner).

Ordained an Elder of the church in July 1844 (only weeks after the Prophet Joseph's martyrdom), Stillman received his patriarchal blessing under the hands of the Prophet's uncle, John Smith, on January 1, 1845, and that same year (17 May) became a member of the church's 2nd Quorum of Seventy, receiving also with his wife (and his first wife by proxy) the ordinance of the holy Endowment in the still unfinished Nauvoo Temple on December 30.

Stillman, on February 12, 1846, wrote: 'I am perfectly satisfied with the authorities of the Church and consider it my indispensable duty to give heed to all things.' Not long after, his young married housekeeper Irene Haskell Pomeroy – who assisted Sister Pond in her ongoing recuperation following the tragic January 1845 death of infant son Charles Stillman Pond – observed firsthand Stillman's commitment to that personal mandate: 'Team after team is going over the river every day for the west ... Brother Pond has gone to help some over the river ...'

Faithful flight: Winter Quarters tragedy & Mormon trek West 
The Pond family – after surviving the Battle of Nauvoo against their intolerant oppressors, as well as the vile persecutions which followed – took their flight from the city at the point of bayonet in the fall of 1846. They were among the last of the persecuted Saints to leave Illinois. Stillman's family (including Maria, who was pregnant with twins), together with the other Mormon exiles, were left to stumble on to Winter Quarters across the frozen flats of Iowa.

Throughout that bitterly cold, disease-infested season (as they lived in tents on the Nebraska bank of the Missouri River) – with hardships to come thereafter, in the John Taylor-led 1847 trek across the Great Plains to Utah's Salt Lake basin – Stillman lost to sickness and to death his beloved wife and little-kingdom of 8 children.

For after the death of infant-son Charles in Nauvoo, the Ponds now lose, on their forced September exodus to Winter Quarters, not only 9-year-old son Lowell Ansen Pond, but also, in mounting grief, malaria-wracked Maria's newborn twin sons. In what was both christening and burial, they honored the infants with the names of the martyred Smith brothers, Joseph and Hyrum. All three sons were buried along the trail in shallow graves in the frozen ground.

But for Stillman and Maria Pond, suddenly bereft as they were of four small children, an already-devastating sacrifice was far from finished. For then is recorded, in the journals of pioneers Horace K. Whitney and Helen Mar Kimball Whitney, the deaths of four additional Pond children after the destitute family's October 16 arrival at the Nebraska encampment – with three of the Ponds' daughters all dying within one five-day period alone:

'On Wednesday, the 2nd of December 1846, Laura Jane Pond, age 14 years, ... died of chills and fever.' Two days later on 'Friday, the 4th of December 1846, Harriet M. Pond, age 11 years, ... died with chills.' Three days later, 'Monday, the 7th of December, 1846, Abigail A. Pond, age 18 years [and a plural bride of Presiding Bishop Newell K. Whitney] ... died with chills.' Just five weeks later, 'Friday, the 15th of January, 1847, Lyman Pond, age 6 years, ... died with chills and fever.'

Ursula Billings Hastings Haskell, fellow 'Camp of Israel' saint, and friend of the Pond family from their New Salem days together (and whose housekeeper-daughter Irene had boarded in an apartment in Stillman's Nauvoo home), later wrote in a letter: 'I suppose you have heard of the deaths in Brother Ponds family. The children are all dead but Elizabeth and Loenza.' Sister Haskell then explained in her letter that the family became ill before arriving at Winter Quarters when Brother Pond paused to earn some money for his family's survival in an unhealthy location, 'a very sickly town' out of the way. 'Lowell died before they arrived, the rest lived to get here and then dropped away one after another. Sister Pond has not recovered and I fear she never will.'

All of the marked Pond siblings perished over an 8-month period in the unforgiving elements of their harsh environs, including, finally, on May 17, 1847, a grief-stricken Maria herself (who, though weakened by malaria, was ultimately overcome by 'consumption' or tuberculosis). And Stillman, once more a widower, unspeakably grieved for each and every one. On too-frequent occasion, moreover, he found himself straddling the threshold of death. But 'the fire of the New Covenant' burned brightly in Stillman's soul, and it was that which, after leaving the Missouri River encampment on June 17, gave him the strength to press on to the mountains of the West, where he knew he would find the Zion that God had prepared for His saints.

Abigail Thorn and a Prophet's mantle 

Stillman's third wife, Abigail Thorn, whom he married at the Endowment House at Salt Lake City in 1849 and by whom he would have 8 additional children, was the abandoned plural spouse of Major Samuel Russell who had, only a year earlier, deserted Abigail and their own newborn infant in preference for the gold fields of California. Stillman had been a member of the same (combined Smoot-Wallace-Russell) 'Camp of Israel' company as the Russells in the trek to Utah (arriving September 25, 1847), and he had since established himself in farming to the west of the city, where he'd witnessed the saving of his locust-infested crops in 1848 by the miraculous arrival of seagulls.

For her part, Abigail – born into a respected family at Lair, Cayuga, New York, on April 2, 1821 – had experienced a powerful conversion to the Mormon faith as a young woman. The same glorious spirit which had so moved her then, had again urged her to join with the Saints at Nauvoo. There, at the age of 22, she received in the spring of 1843 her patriarchal blessing under the hands of Hyrum Smith, the Prophet's brother, just fifteen months before his martyrdom at Carthage. Hyrum blessed her with the gift of dreams and visions by the Holy Ghost (she would also enjoy in her life the gift of tongues and a keen discernment of spirits). Hers was the special privilege of witnessing at Nauvoo on August 8, 1844, as scores of accounts that were recorded at the time attest, the transfiguration of Brigham Young, when the mantle and unmistakable voice of the Prophet Joseph Smith fell upon him as a special sign to the Saints of his high calling and acceptance of the Lord to lead His people.

Pioneering at Spanish Fork and Cache Valley 
Like Zebedee Coltrin and other Saints who preceded them, Stillman and Abigail removed south from Salt Lake to Spanish Fork in 1857. But less than three years later, in 1860, they turned back again, this time to Cache Valley's Richmond in the far north – just months before shots were fired at Fort Sumter in the East the following spring. Their hard-won livelihoods passed quietly during the years of national Civil War. The Ponds considered themselves greatly blessed.

Endowment officiator, Seventy's President and Apostolic mentoree 
Stillman had been able to officiate in the Endowment House in Salt Lake City under the supervision of President Heber C. Kimball, but also, at the Council House, to be mentored in mathematics and astronomy in the evenings under the clear, guiding voice of Apostle Orson Pratt.

In 1852 Stillman had once again married, this time to Elizabeth Bessac, by whom he was given another child. But his fourth wife divorced him a few years later and married another man. Yet was Stillman's fidelity and obedience rewarded by church leaders, and on February 16, 1853 he was ordained Senior President of the 35th Quorum of Seventy – a calling and capacity he faithfully fulfilled for the remainder of his days.

Eldest son, ZCMI investor and St. George Temple laborer 
Notwithstanding those hard-life years in Richmond, Stillman received for his comfort (on June 25, 1865) a second patriarchal blessing under the hand of Patriarch Charles W. Hyde – just weeks after the assassination of President Lincoln (Stillman's eldest daughter by Abigail, Mary Anner Pond, only 4 weeks before Lincoln's death, had married John Buxton, an English immigrant who became a successful businessman in Teton Valley, Idaho; they raised 12 children).

Three years after receiving his second patriarchal blessing, Stillman returned to his natal home of Hubbardston, Massachusetts, upon the occasion of his father's passing. There, he secured his 'eldest' son's portion of his father's estate, returning again to Utah to invest his inheritance in the Richmond Co-op, known as the ZCMI – an investment that proved to be a wise and profitable one. In his later years, Stillman would travel south to St. George to assist in hauling quarry-stone for the building of a temple there.

Final years and family legacy 
In 1870 Stillman married for a fifth and final time. A widow, Anna Regina Svensson-Jacobsen (alternatively, 'Swenson'), bore him an additional four sons before his death at age 74 (after a two-year lingering illness) on September 30, 1878. Third wife Abigail died 26 years later on March 7, 1904.

By all of these wives Stillman would become grand-patriarch to a sea of descendants scattered throughout the intermountain West (and beyond) bearing such names as Buxton, Bowen, Merrill, Whittle, Kingsbury, Lewis, Lear, Egbert, Read, Pope, Telford, Yeats, Van Noy, Rose, and Russell. From a foundation of noble progenitors, Stillman left his multitudinous posterity with a mighty 'fire of faith' legacy – one of sacrifice, endurance, and forging ahead (despite overwhelming heartache and loss) to realize, at last, through unflinching tenacity, persistent labor and love, a useful, abundant, and well-lived life.

References 

.
.
.
.
.
.
. (excerpts from letters of June 2, and July 4, 6 & 27, 1845, and April 1847, used by permission. Ursula & Irene Haskell, mother and daughter living in New Salem, Massachusetts, were baptized March 1, 1842, on the same day as Irene's lifelong friend Emmeline B. Woodward, who later became the wife of both Bishop Newell K. Whitney and President Daniel H. Wells and who served as General Relief Society President of the Church. Francis M. Pomeroy (1822–1882) and Irene Haskell were married by Brigham Young during a Peterborough, New Hampshire church conference, July 12–14, 1844, on which occasion news of the martyrdom of the Prophet Joseph and Patriarch Hyrum Smith at Carthage, Illinois, reached Elders Young and Orson Pratt. The newlyweds followed the Brethren to Nauvoo in May 1845; they were followed a year later by Ursula (1799–1875) and her 12-year-old son Thales (1834–1909). Husband and father, millwright Ashbel Haskell (1798–1849), who sailed for San Francisco in February 1846 with Sam Brannan and company on the Brooklyn, perished before reaching Great Salt Lake City to join his family. Irene ultimately became the mother of 8 children. At the time of the massive 1858 Latter-day Saint exodus, or 'move south' to avoid Johnston's Army, she suffered a burned hand which never healed, requiring her arm to be amputated. 'The shock undermined her health,' and she died at age 34, in 1860, at the home of her friend Emmeline B. Wells. 'Ursula then took full charge of the children and kept the family together in Salt Lake City until Francis became well located in Paris, Idaho, where, in 1864, he went into partnership with Charles C. Rich in a saw- and gristmill business. Ursula remained in Paris until the time of her death,' pp. 54–56)
.
.
.

External links 
 Mormon Pioneer Overland Travel, 1847–1868: Stillman Pond, the Abraham O. Smoot – George B. Wallace Company of Brigham Young's 'Camp of Israel' was the companion company of the Abraham O. Smoot – Samuel Russell Company (1847) – with 318 people, 500 animals, and a hundred wagons (Smoot's 100 'camp-men' were 50 from each of the contingents of Wallace and Russell, who served as Smoot's captains), LDS Church Historical Department 'Mormon Overland Trail' archives, Salt Lake City.
 Stillman Pond, a Biographical Sketch – Leon Y. Pond & H. Ray Pond biography at FamilySearch.
 SUP Pioneer Stories: Stillman Pond – 1847 Utah Pioneer and his Family The Sons of Utah Pioneers (SUP) online edition – Ricky Lynn Pond (ed.)
 Winter Quarter's Pioneer Cemetery Map – BYU Winter Quarters Memorial website, College of Life Sciences, Brigham Young University, Provo, Utah; the Stillman Pond family graves: No. 154 – Maria Louisa Davis Pond (wife, age 35); No. 30 – Abigail A. Pond (daughter, age 18); No. 21 – Laura Jane Pond & Harriet M. Pond (daughters, ages 14 and 11, buried together); and No. 56 – Lyman Pond (son, age 6). Marking the memorial also (at first blush, perhaps in late tribute) appears to be the name of Stillman's first wife, Almyra (mother of Abigail and Laura), who, although not having perished at Winter Quarters, was slain by disease in 1833 at Hubbardston, Massachusetts. More probably, however, it represents an act of mistaken identity: it may have been erroneously thought that Stillman's eldest daughter, Elizabeth Almira, who did not succumb to tuberculosis, also had perished with her siblings at the Missouri River encampment. If so, this might explain the spelling of the name as it appears on the memorial, spelled with an 'i' – which distinguishes Elizabeth's own second given name, 'Almira,' from her mother's first name.
 'Letters of a Proselyte: The Hascall-Pomeroy Correspondence' – Utah Historical Quarterly XXV (1957).
 Mormon Nauvoo Archaeological Geophysical 3-D Imaging – John H. McBride, "Assessing the Archaeological Resources of Mormon Nauvoo with Three-dimensional Geophysical Imaging," BYU Journal of Undergraduate Research, Brigham Young University, Provo, Utah (2014).

1803 births
1878 deaths
People from Hubbardston, Massachusetts
People from Westminster, Massachusetts
People from Templeton, Massachusetts
People from Worcester County, Massachusetts
People from New Salem, Massachusetts
People from Franklin County, Massachusetts
Latter Day Saints from Massachusetts
Religious leaders from Massachusetts
Converts to Mormonism from Protestantism
People from Nauvoo, Illinois
People from Hancock County, Illinois
Latter Day Saints from Illinois
Mormon pioneers
People from Omaha, Nebraska
People from Spanish Fork, Utah
People from Utah County, Utah
People from Richmond, Utah
People from Cache County, Utah
Latter Day Saints from Utah
Leaders in the Church of Christ (Latter Day Saints)
Latter Day Saint leaders
American leaders of the Church of Jesus Christ of Latter-day Saints
Presidents of the Seventy (LDS Church)
Mormonism and polygamy